Ban Khlong is a subdistrict in the Mueang Phitsanulok District of Phitsanulok Province, Thailand. In 2019 it had a population of 13,560 and 6,184 households. In this subdistrict is King Naresuan Maharat camp (4th Infantry Division).

Geography
The topography of Ban Khlong is fertile lowlands with an area of 8.1 km2. The subdistrict is bordered to the north-west by Phlai Chumphon subdistrict, to the east by Hua Ro subdistrict and the city of Phitsanulok, to the south by Wat Chan subdistrict. Ban Khlong subdistrict lies in the Nan Basin, which is part of the Chao Phraya Watershed. The Nan river flows east of Moo1, Moo2 and Moo3 of the subdistrict and is a natural water source for agricultural consumption. An irrigation canal (Huai Nong Khlong Bueng) flows from Phlai Chumphon subdistrict, through Moo5 of Ban Khlong subdistrict to Wat Chan subdistrict and is an important water source for agricultural consumption and also a raw water source to produce village water supply. The area to the west of this irrigation canal is for agriculture and the area to the east of this irrigation canal is for urbanization.

History
The history of Ban Khlong has a legend that says Wang Chan is the residence of King Naresuan. Because the Ayutthaya period was very tumultuous, the military service placed a fence around it and called it King Naresuan the Great camp. Many skeletons have been discovered during excavations for the hospital building. This place seems to have been a burial ground for soldiers. In 1996 Ban Khlong Subdistrict Administrative Organization - SAO (ongkan borihan suan tambon) was established. On 9 March 1999 Ban Khlong subdistrict lost the communities Ban Khlong Phatthana and Ban Khlong Samakkhee (Moo4) and community Sa Song Hong (Moo1) to the growing city of Phitsanulok. The new borders are located 200 meter west of the regional highway 117 (landmarks 20-21) and with the military camp (landmarks 1-2). Upgrade to subdistrict municipality (thesaban tambon) was on 15 August 2012, effectively 24 August 2012.

Administration
The administration of Ban Khlong municipality is responsible for an area that covers 8.1 km2 and consists of five administrative villages, as of 2019: 13,560 people and 6,184 households.

Administrative villages contain many villages such as:
 Moo2 - Ban Rim Nan
 Moo3 - Ban Pak Phu Phiphaksa

Logo
The Ban Khlong subdistrict-municipality (thesaban tambon Ban Khlong) logo shows a standing Buddha, prevent family members from fighting.

Temples
Ban Khlong subdistrict is home to the following active temples, where Theravada Buddhism is practiced by local residents:

Infrastructure

Education
Vocational education:
 Phitsanulok Polytechnic College (Moo1)
Primary education:
 Wat Yang School
 Ban Khlong Municipal Kindergarten.

Healthcare
There are Ban Khlong health-promoting hospital in Ban Bang Sakae (Moo2) and Fort Somdet Phra Naresuan Maharat hospital in Ban Wat Yang (Moo1).

Transportation
Major roads are:
 Highway 12, Phitsanulok-Sukhothai route.
 Highway 117, Phitsanulok-Nakhon Sawan route.

Electricity
All households in subdistrict Ban Khlong have access to the electricity network.

Communications
All households have access to the fixed and mobile telephone network.

Waterworks
There are three pump and water filter units:
 Water supply system at Ban Wat Yang (Moo1)
 Water supply system at Ban Wat Sud Sawat (Moo3)
 Water supply system at Ban Khlong (Moo5)
Total water users of this water supply system is 1,300.Provincial Waterworks Authority (PWA) is not cooperating to provide information on the number of households that have access to their water network in Ban Khlong subdistrict.

Economy

People west of the irrigation canal work in the agricultural sector.Companies in Ban Khlong subdistrict are:
 Phitsanulok Provincial Transport Office, Department of Land Transport
 True Regional Office Phitsanulok.
The presence of King Naresuan Maharat Camp (Thai:ค่ายสมเด็จพระนเรศวรมหาราช khai somdec phra naresuan maharacha) 4th Infantry Division of  Royal Thai Army in Ban Wat Yang (Moo1) is also important for employment.

References

Tambon of Phitsanulok province
Populated places in Phitsanulok province